The National Labor Union (NLU) is the first national labor federation in the United States. Founded in 1866 and dissolved in 1873, it paved the way for other organizations, such as the Knights of Labor and the AFL (American Federation of Labor). It was led by William H. Sylvis and Andrew Cameron.

Organizational history
The National Labor Union (NLU) followed the unsuccessful efforts of labor activists to form a national coalition of local trade unions. The NLU sought instead to bring together all of the national labor organizations in existence, as well as the "eight-hour leagues" established to press for the eight-hour day, to create a national federation that could press for labor reforms and help found national unions in those areas where none existed. The new organization favored arbitration over strikes and called for the creation of a national labor party as an alternative to the two existing parties.

The NLU drew much of its support from construction unions and other groups of skilled employees but also invited the unskilled and farmers to join. On the other hand, it campaigned for the exclusion of Chinese workers from the United States and made only halting, ineffective efforts to defend the rights of women and Black people. African-American workers established their own Colored National Labor Union as an adjunct, but their support of the Republican Party and the prevalent racism of the citizens of the United States limited its effectiveness.

The NLU achieved early success, but one that proved less significant in practice. In 1868, Congress passed the statute for which the Union had campaigned so hard, providing the eight-hour day for government workers. Many government agencies, however, reduced wages at the same time that they reduced hours. While President Grant ordered federal departments not to reduce wages, his order was ignored by many. The NLU also obtained similar legislation in a number of states, such as New York and California, but discovered that loopholes in the statute made them unenforceable or ineffective.

In early 1869, the Chicago Tribune boasted that the NLU had 800,000 members; Sylvis himself put the figure at only 600,000. Both of these figures turned out to be greatly exaggerated. It collapsed when it adopted the policy that electoral politics, with a particular emphasis on monetary reform , were the only means for advancing its agenda. The organization was spectacularly unsuccessful at the polls and lost virtually all of its union supporters, many of whom moved on to the newly formed Knights of Labor. The depression of the 1870s, which drove down union membership generally, was one of the final factors contributing to the end of the NLU, the other being the dismantling of policies instituted during Radical Reconstruction.

See also

 Labor federation competition in the U.S.
 International Workingmen's Association in America

Footnotes

Further reading

 Philip S. Foner History of the Labor Movement in the United States.  Vol. 1: From Colonial Times to the Founding of the American Federation of Labor. New York: International Publishers, 1947.

Defunct trade unions in the United States
1872 disestablishments in the United States
Anti-immigration politics in the United States
National trade union centers of the United States
Trade unions established in 1866
1866 establishments in the United States
Trade unions disestablished in the 1870s